Kure Dam is an earthfill dam located in Fukuoka Prefecture in Japan. The dam is used for irrigation. The catchment area of the dam is 0.3 km2. The dam impounds about 40  ha of land when full and can store 414 thousand cubic meters of water. The construction of the dam was completed in 1970.

References

Dams in Fukuoka Prefecture
1970 establishments in Japan